Bakudi railway station is a railway station on Sahibganj loop line under the Malda railway division of Eastern Railway zone. It is situated beside National Highway 80 at Bakudi in Sahebganj district in the Indian state of Jharkhand.

References

Railway stations in Sahibganj district
Malda railway division